Guzmania testudinis is a plant species in the genus Guzmania. This species is native to Ecuador and Colombia.

Two varieties are recognized:

Guzmania testudinis var. splendida H.Luther - Ecuador
Guzmania testudinis var. testudinis - Colombia, Ecuador

References

testudinis
Flora of Ecuador
Flora of Colombia
Plants described in 1979